The 1988 Swedish Golf Tour was the third season of the Swedish Golf Tour, a series of professional golf tournaments for women held in Sweden and Denmark.

The tour shared Tournament Directors with the 1988 Swedish Golf Tour, Hans Ström, Bengt Norström and Claes Grönberg, plus Charlotte Montgomery. The player council consisted of Pia Nilsson, Hillewi Hagström, Viveca Hoff and Liv Wollin. 

Tournaments were played over 54 holes with no cut, the SI and LET events over 72 holes with cuts.

Schedule
The season consisted of 8 tournaments played between May and August, where two events were included on the 1988 Ladies European Tour.

Order of Merit
The sponsored name was the ICA-Kuriren Order of Merit.

Source:

See also
1988 Swedish Golf Tour (men's tour)

References

External links
Official homepage of the Swedish Golf Tour

Swedish Golf Tour (women)
Swedish Golf Tour (women)